Ottawa is a city in the province of Ontario and the capital of Canada.

Ottawa may also refer to:

Places

Canada
 Ottawa (City of) (electoral district), a historical electoral district in Ontario
 Ottawa (County of) (electoral district), a historical electoral district in Quebec
 Ottawa (Ontario provincial electoral district), an electoral district from 1867 to 1908
 Ottawa (Quebec provincial electoral district), an electoral district from 1867 to 1919
 Ottawa Islands, islands on the east coast of the Hudson Bay
 Ottawa River, in Ontario and Quebec

United States
 Ottawa, Illinois, a city
 Ottawa, Kansas, a city
 Ottawa, Minnesota, an unincorporated community
 Ottawa, Ohio, a village
 Ottawa, Oklahoma, an unincorporated community
 Ottawa, Wisconsin, a town
 Ottawa (community), Wisconsin, an unincorporated community
 Ottawa River (Lake Erie), in Michigan and Ohio in the United States, which drains into Lake Erie
 Ottawa River (Auglaize River tributary), in Ohio, United States

Elsewhere
 Ottawa, Ivory Coast, a village
 Ottawa, KwaZulu-Natal, a suburb of Durban, KwaZulu-Natal, South Africa

Ships
 HMCS Ottawa (H60), a C-class destroyer that served with the Royal Canadian Navy from 1938 to 1942
 HMCS Ottawa (H31), a G-class destroyer that served with the Royal Canadian Navyfrom 1943 to 1945
 HMCS Ottawa (DDH 229), a St. Laurent-class destroyer that served in the Royal Canadian Navy from 1956 to 1992
 HMCS Ottawa (FFH 341), a Halifax-class frigate commissioned in 1996
 SS Ottawa, a steamship that was once the SS Germanic
 Ottawa (shipwreck), a tugboat that sank in Lake Superior
 Ottawa, a tanker built in 1964 by Swan Hunter

Other uses
 Government of Canada
 Odawa or Ottawa, a First Nation/Native American ethnic group
 Ottawa dialect, their language
 Ottawa Tribe of Oklahoma, a federally recognized tribe in the United States

See also
 Grand Traverse Band of Ottawa and Chippewa Indians, a federally recognized tribe in the United States
 HMCS Ottawa, a list of Canadian warships
 Ottawa County (disambiguation)
 Ottawa Township (disambiguation)
 Ottawa Treaty, a treaty first signed in 1997 that bans anti-personnel landmines
 Ottawa Charter for Health Promotion, a document signed at a 1987 World Health Organization convention
 Otawa, a rural area in the Bay of Plenty region of New Zealand
 Ottawan, a disco group